|}

The Prix de Fontainebleau is a Group 3 flat horse race in France open to three-year-old thoroughbred colts and geldings. It is run over a distance of 1,600 metres (about 1 mile) at Longchamp in April.

History
The event is named after Fontainebleau Forest, the location of the Hippodrome de la Solle racecourse. The Société d'Encouragement organised an annual race meeting at the venue from 1862 to 1891.

The Prix de Fontainebleau was introduced at Longchamp in 1889. It was originally a 2,200-metre contest restricted to horses having their first race of the season.

The modern Prix de Fontainebleau was established in 1952. It was initially run over 1,600 metres, and designed to serve as a trial for the first colts' Classics of the year. The first winner, Thunderhead, subsequently won the 2,000 Guineas in England.

The race's distance was modified several times during the 1960s. It was run over 1,400 metres (1965), 1,300 metres (1966) and 1,500 metres (1967) before reverting to 1,600 metres in 1968.

Seventeen winners of the modern Prix de Fontainebleau have achieved victory in the Poule d'Essai des Poulains. The first was Neptunus in 1964, and the most recent was Brametot in 2017. The most recent Poule d'Essai des Poulains winner to run in the Prix de Fontainebleau was Victor Ludorum, fourth in 2020.

The race was opened to geldings from the 2020 running.

Records
Leading jockey since 1952 (6 wins):
 Maurice Philipperon – Farabi (1967), Blinis (1971), Arctic Tern (1976), Irish River (1979), Castle Guard (1983), Kendor (1989)

Leading trainer since 1952 (10 wins):
 André Fabre – Soviet Star (1987), Rainbow Corner (1992), Zieten (1993), Fadeyev (1994), Indian Danehill (1999), Berine's Son (2000), Bowman (2002), Clodovil (2003), Territories (2015), Persian King (2019)

Leading owner since 1952 (4 wins):
 Gertrude Widener – Aerodynamic (1961), Prudent (1962), Grey Dawn (1965), Timmy My Boy (1968)
 HH Aga Khan IV – Blushing Groom (1977), Ashkalani (1996), Daylami (1997), Rajsaman (2010)

Winners since 1974

Earlier winners

 1889: Amazon
 1890: Yellow
 1891: Closerie
 1892: Diarbek
 1893: Brocart
 1894: Le Pompon
 1895: Salambo
 1896: Pas de Danse
 1897: Nisard
 1898: Volnay
 1899: Fourire
 1900: Ivry
 1901: Quartier Mestre
 1902: Retz
 1903: Alpha
 1904: Lorlot
 1905: Saint Michel
 1906: Organiste
 1907: Calomel
 1908: Quintette
 1909: Negofol
 1910: Aloes III
 1911: Made in England
 1912: De Viris
 1913: Riverain
 1914: Oreste
 1920: Sourbier
 1921: Vespertilion
 1922: Gaurisankar
 1923: Mackenzie
 1924: Indra
 1925: The Sirdar
 1926: War Mist
 1927: Lusignan
 1928: Whirligig
 1929: Paris Voyeur
 1930: Commanderie
 1931: Fondor
 1932: Macaroni
 1933: Le Cacique
 1934: Duplex
 1935: Peut Etre
 1936: Genetout
 1937: Le Calme
 1938: Cor de Chasse
 1939: Mon Tresor
 1940: Prince Igor
 1941: Rhodora
 1942: Warrior
 1943: Sextidi
 1944: Prince Bio
 1945: Chanteur
 1947: Solina
 1948: Turmoil
 1952: Thunderhead
 1953: Tosco
 1954: Ferriol
 1955: Chargeur
 1956: Tenareze
 1957: Franc Luron
 1958: Pantouflard
 1959: Javelot
 1960: Bondolfi
 1961: Aerodynamic
 1962: Prudent
 1963: Manderley
 1964: Neptunus
 1965: Grey Dawn
 1966: Barbare
 1967: Farabi
 1968: Timmy My Boy
 1969: Le Mas Marvent
 1970: Breton
 1971: Blinis
 1972: Hard to Beat
 1973: African Sky

See also
 List of French flat horse races

References

 France Galop / Racing Post:

 france-galop.com – A Brief History: Prix de Fontainebleau.
 galop.courses-france.com – Prix de Fontainebleau – Palmarès depuis 1980.
 galopp-sieger.de – Prix de Fontainebleau.
 ifhaonline.org – International Federation of Horseracing Authorities – Prix de Fontainebleau (2019).
 pedigreequery.com – Prix de Fontainebleau – Longchamp.

Flat horse races for three-year-olds
Longchamp Racecourse
Horse races in France
1889 establishments in France
Recurring sporting events established in 1889